This is a list of labels that were owned or distributed by EMI before its dismantling in 2013.

Blue Note Label Group
Angel Records
Seraphim Records
Guardian Records
Blue Note Records
Metro Blue
Pacific Jazz/World Pacific
Narada Jazz
Manhattan Records
Narada Productions
Back Porch Records
Higher Octave Music
CyberOctave

Capitol Music Group
Capitol Records
Harvest Records
Imperial Records
Priority Records
Get Money Gang Entertainment 
Ice H2O Records 
Lench Mob Records 
Twenty-Two Recordings 
The RMG Music Group 
Pinegrove Records 
Capitol Latin

Caroline Distribution
Astralwerks Records
Caroline Records
Definitive Jux Records
The Front Line
Fuel Records 
Gracie Productions
Gyroscope Records
Merovingian Music
Nature Sounds
Green Streets Entertainment
Stones Throw Records

EMI Christian Music Group
Credential Recordings
EMI Gospel
Forefront Records
Sparrow Records
Re:Think 
Tooth and Nail Records
BEC Recordings
Solid State Records
Topshelf Records
VSR Music Group

Virgin Music Group
Virgin Records
Astralwerks
Charisma Records
Relentless Records
Venture Records
10 Records

Standalone labels
EMI Records
Capitol Records Nashville/EMI Records Nashville
hEMIsphere
Mute Records
Positiva Records
Stateside Records

International labels

EMI Africa
EMI South Africa
EMI Nigeria

EMI Asia

EMI Arabia
Soutelphan
Alam El Phan
Relax-in International
Farasan
Rotana Records

EMI China
Gold Typhoon 
Path Orient

EMI India
GramCo 
Saregama/RPG Music

EMI Indonesia
Arka Music

EMI Japan

EMI Korea
SM Entertainment

EMI Malaysia

EMI Pakistan

EMI Philippines
PolyEast Records 
Galaxy Records
Cool Records
Marigold

EMI Taiwan

EMI Thailand
Music Train (Rod Fai Don Tri)

EMI Europe
EMIDISC
EMI Europe Generic

EMI Czech Republic

EMI Finland

EMI France
Pathé Records
Virgin Music France
Delabel
Hostile Delabel
Delabel Editions (now owned by Sony/ATV)
Source
Labels
Gum Prod
Livin' Astro
Zonophone

EMI Germany
Electrola
UDR Records

EMI Greece
Minos EMI
Rootopia

EMI Poland

EMI Spain
Hispavox
Odeon Records

EMI Sweden 

 Platina Records

EMI Turkey
EMI Kent Music

EMI United Kingdom
EMI Records
EMI Classics
Parlophone Records
Regal Recordings
RAK Records
Virgin Records
Chrysalis Records

EMI South America

EMI Argentina
Reliquias

EMI Chile

EMI Colombia

Mexico

Capitol Latin
EMI Televisa Music

Q-Productions

EMI Oceania

EMI Music Australia

EMI Music Fiji

EMI Music New Zealand

EMI Music Papua New Guinea

EMI Music Papua Samoa

EMI Music Papua Tonga

Independent labels distributed by EMI
Apple Records
CJ E&M Music and Live
Time Records
Primary Wave Records
Ruffhouse
Alter Bridge Recordings
Nettwerk Productions

Defunct labels
2kSounds
Columbia Graphophone Company 
Ministry of Sound Australia 
EMI Films
His Master's Voice
RAK Records
Regal Zonophone Records
Studio 2 Stereo Records
EMI Records Group
Enigma Records
SBK Records
Pendulum Records
Wild Pitch Records
Top Rank Records
I.R.S. Records
Liberty Records

See also

EMI
List of EMI artists

EMI